The hylocitrea (Hylocitrea bonensis), also known as the yellow-flanked whistler or olive-flanked whistler, is a species of bird that is endemic to montane forests on the Indonesian island of Sulawesi. It is monotypic within the genus Hylocitrea, and has traditionally been considered a member of the family Pachycephalidae, but recent genetic evidence suggests it should be placed in a monotypic subfamily of the family Bombycillidae, or even its own family, Hylocitreidae. A 2019 study found it to be a sister group to a clade containing the hypocolius (Hypocoliidae) and the extinct Hawaiian honeyeaters (Mohoidae), with the clade containing all three being a sister group to the silky-flycatchers (Ptiliogonatidae). The divergences forming these families occurred in the early Miocene, about 20-23 million years ago.

References

Bombycilloidea
Birds described in 1894
Birds described in 1925
Endemic birds of Sulawesi
Extant Miocene first appearances
Taxonomy articles created by Polbot